The longhorn moth or yellow-barred long-horn (Nemophora degeerella) is a diurnal lepidopteran from the moths family Adelidae (fairy longhorn moths).

Distribution and habitat
This species is present on most of Europe, but it is fairly common in north west Europe. The habitat of these moths is damp deciduous forests with wooded lanes and hedgerows.

Description
The head is dark brown, with dark and yellow hair-like scales. The thorax has a bronzy golden shining. Forewings are shiny bronzy golden yellow or shiny ochreous with longitudinal dark brown and lead-gray blueish-violet shining streaks. A yellow transversal band cross the whole forewings, framed by two lead-gray blueish-violet shining stripes with a dark brown border. The three longitudinal lead-gray, blueish-violet shining stripes situated in the basal part of the wings do not treach the transversal fascia. Rear wings are brownish gray.
The longhorn moth males have filiform antennae ranging up to five times their body length, while the female has much shorter antennae. Moreover in the females the basal part of the antennae is thickened by black scales, while the tip is white.

Nemophora degeerella is very similar to Nemophora congruella but N. congruella is slightly smaller, the forewing markings are bright yellow and the band is located closer to the base. In the females of N. congruella is missing the beard-like scales present in the basal part of the antennae of the females of N. degeerella. Also Adela croesella is very similar, but it is much smaller and more colorful. The gray blueish-violet stripes are at least as wide as the yellow central band.

Biology
These moths fly in the day. The flight period ranges from May to July. The caterpillar feeds on birch leaf litter. The adult moth feeds on Persicaria bistorta, Leucanthemum vulgare and nettles. This species has a single annual generation (univoltine). Hibernation takes place in the form larvae in a cocoon of leaves.

Gallery

References

Bibliography
 Kozlov, M. V. (2003): Annotated checklist of the European species of Nemophora (Adelidae). - Nota lepidopterologica 26 (3/4): 115-126
 L.N. Perette, F. Spill et M. Rauch, Les Papillons de la Réserve de la Biosphère des Vosges du Nord, Eguelshardt, Cicogna, 33
 Linnaeus, C. 1758. Systema Naturae, Ed. X. (Systema naturae per regna tria naturae, secundum classes, ordines, genera, species, cum characteribus, differentiis, synonymis, locis. Tomus I. Editio decima, reformata.) Holmiae. Systema Nat. ed. 10 i-ii + 1-824.
 Robinson, G. S. & E. Schmidt Nielsen (1983): The Microlepidoptera described by Linnaeus and Clerck. — Systematic Entomology 8: 191-242.
Küppers, P. V. 1980. Untersuchungen zur Taxonomie und Phylogenie der Westpaläarktischen Adelinae (Lepidoptera: Adelidae), Dissertation, Wissenschaftliche Beiträge Karlsruhe, Verlag M.Wahl, Karlsruhe.
Kurz, M. A. & M. E. Kurz 2000–2010. Naturkundliches Informationssystem.

External links

Norfolk Moths
Funet Taxonomy
Nemophora degeerella on YouTube
Lepiforum.de

Adelidae
Moths described in 1758
Moths of Europe
Taxa named by Carl Linnaeus